David Malan may refer to:

David J. Malan, Professor of Computer Science at Harvard University
David H. Malan (1922–2020), British psychotherapist

May also refer to:

Dawid Malan (born 1987), an English cricketer who plays for England and Middlesex.